Max Chapman may refer to:

 Max Chapman (rugby league), Australian rugby league footballer active in the 1990s
 Max Chapman (artist) (1911–1999), English painter and critic
 Max C. Chapman, American business executive